Hexed is the tenth and final studio album by Finnish melodic death metal band Children of Bodom. It was released on 8 March 2019.

It is the only album to feature guitarist Daniel Freyberg, who became a member of the band in 2016, the last album to feature longtime members Jaska Raatikainen, Henkka Seppälä, and Janne Wirman, who all quit the band in November 2019, and the last Children of Bodom album to be recorded and released by Alexi Laiho before his death in late 2020. It is also the last recording to use the Children of Bodom name, as the departing members (Raatikainen, Seppälä and Wirman) filed for the rights to the name, making it so Laiho must be granted permission from all three to continue using the name. Laiho and Freyberg would continue with a different lineup under the name Bodom After Midnight, until Laiho's death.

Hexed is the second album (after Relentless Reckless Forever) not to have a song with "Bodom" in the title, and the band's first album since Follow the Reaper to include neo-classical elements. Most of the songs are tuned in Drop B tuning, while the songs "This Road" and "Glass Houses" are tuned to D tuning.

Track listing

Personnel
Children of Bodom
Alexi Laiho – lead guitar, lead vocals
Jaska Raatikainen – drums, backing vocals
Henkka Seppälä – bass, backing vocals
Janne Wirman – keyboards
Daniel Freyberg – rhythm guitar, backing vocals

Production
Mikko Karmila – producer, engineering, mixing
Denis Forkas – cover art

Charts

References

2019 albums
Children of Bodom albums
Nuclear Blast albums